Akbarabad-e Sardasht (also Romanized as Akbarābād-e Sardasht) is a village in Kushk-e Qazi Rural District, in the Central District of Fasa County, Fars Province, Iran. At the 2006 census, its population was 227, in 57 families.

References 

Populated places in Fasa County